Jin Yilian (born September 1929) is a Chinese computer scientist and a pioneer of supercomputing in the country.

Biography 
Jin was born in Tianjin, with his ancestral home in Changzhou, Jiangsu. He graduated from the department of electrical engineering of Tsinghua University in 1951. From 1956 to 1958, he studied electronic computer science at the Institute of Fine Mechanics and Computation Technology of Soviet Union Academy of Sciences. Jin was elected an academician of the Chinese Academy of Engineering in 1994.

Honors and awards 
In 2002, Jin was the recipient of the prestigious State Preeminent Science and Technology Award, the highest scientific prize awarded in China. Asteroid 100434 Jinyilian, discovered by the Beijing Schmidt CCD Asteroid Program in 1996, was named in his honor. The official  was published by the Minor Planet Center on 19 February 2006.

References

External links 
 Jin Yilian – Awardee of Technological Science Prize, Ho Leung Ho Lee Foundation

1929 births
Living people
Chinese computer scientists
Chinese electrical engineers
Engineers from Tianjin
Members of the Chinese Academy of Engineering
Scientists from Tianjin
Yaohua High School alumni
Tsinghua University alumni